Hugo Marcelino Gottfrit (9 January 1951 – 16 May 2012) was an Argentine football defender who played in the Argentine Primera División and Liga MX México Primera División.

Career
Born in Darregueira, Buenos Aires, Gottfrit began playing football with local side Darregueira F.C. He began his professional career with Argentine first division club Gimnasia y Esgrima de La Plata, and he would captain the club during the 1975 season. In 1976, Gottfrit joined Primera División side Atlético Potosino. He would spend the next five seasons in Mexico, joining Atlante F.C. after two seasons with Potosino. In 1981, Gottfrit returned to Gimnasia La Plata where he would finish his career in the second division.

He played for Argentina at the youth level in 1973.

Personal
On 16 May 2012, Gottfrit died after being in the hospital for several days at age 61.

References

External links
 Hugo Gottfrit at BDFA.com.ar 
 

1951 births
2012 deaths
Argentine footballers
Argentine expatriate footballers
Argentine Primera División players
Liga MX players
Club de Gimnasia y Esgrima La Plata footballers
San Luis F.C. players
Atlante F.C. footballers
Expatriate footballers in Mexico
Association football central defenders
Sportspeople from Buenos Aires Province
Argentine people of Volga German descent